Gan Mao Ling is a Chinese herbal medication alleged to be effective in the early stages of cold or flu.  

The ingredients of the remedy are:
 Ilex root, Gang Mei Gen
 Evodia leaf, San Cha Ku
 Chrysanthemum flower, Ju Hua
 Vitex herb, Huang Jing Cao
 Isatis root, Ban Lan Gen
 Lonicera flower, Jin Yin Hua

References

Traditional Chinese medicine
Traditional Chinese medicine pills